Helmbach may refer to:
Helmbach (Speyerbach), a river of Rhineland-Palatinate, Germany, right tributary of the Speyerbach
Helmbachweiher, a lake in Rhineland-Palatinate, Germany